The 1884–85 FAW Welsh Cup was the eighth edition of the annual knockout tournament for competitive football teams in Wales.

First round

Replay

Rhyl protest.

Second round

Replay

Third round

Replay

Disputed goal, Newtown walked off.

Semifinals

Final

Replay

References

Bibliography

Notes 

 The History of the Welsh Cup 1877-1993 by Ian Garland (1991) 
 Welsh Football Data Archive

1884-85
1884–85 domestic association football cups